Muong may refer to:

Muong people, third largest of Vietnam's 53 minority groups
Muong language, spoken by the Mường people of Vietnam
No Muong, king of the southern Laotian Kingdom of Champasak in 1811
 Mueang, pre-modern Tai polities in mainland Southeast Asia, China, and India, pronounced "Mường" in Vietnamese

Language and nationality disambiguation pages